John Scott may refer to:

Academics
 John Scott (1639–1695), English clergyman and devotional writer
 John Witherspoon Scott (1800–1892), American minister, college president, and father of First Lady Caroline Harrison
 John Work Scott (1807–1879), American president of Washington College
 John Scott (medical school dean) (1851–1914), New Zealand professor, artist, and medical school dean
 John Scott (sociologist) (born 1949), British sociologist
 John R. Scott Sr. (1840/41–1929), president of Edward Waters College, minister of the African Methodist Episcopal Church
 John Paul Scott (geneticist) (1909–2000), American behavior geneticist and comparative psychologist

Arts and entertainment
 John Scott (engraver) (1774–1827), English engraver
 John Scott (1849–1919), English artist
 John Beldon Scott, American art historian
 John T. Scott (1940–2007), African-American sculptor, painter, printmaker, and collagist
 John Scott of Amwell (1730–1783), Quaker poet and friend of Samuel Johnson
 John A. Scott (born 1948), Australian poet and novelist, now using the name John Scott
 John Scott (composer) (born 1930), British film composer, conductor, musician, classical, jazz
 John Scott (organist) (1956–2015), English-born organist of St. Thomas's Church, New York City
 John Scott (choreographer), founder of the Irish Modern Dance Theatre, now John Scott Dance
 John Stuart Scott (born 1966), American television director
 John Scott (Fringe), character played by Mark Valley in the TV series Fringe
 John Alden Scott (1916–1996), American newspaper publisher, politician
 John Scott (editor) (1784–1821), editor of London Magazine, killed in a duel in 1821
 John Scott (writer) (1912–1976), American journalist, editor for Time magazine
 John Prindle Scott (1877–1932), American author, lecturer, educator and composer of art songs
 John Scott Martin (1926–2009), English actor
 John Scott (Canadian artist) (born 1950), Canadian multimedia painter, sculptor, and installation artist

Politics and law

United States
 John Scott (sheriff), interim sheriff of Los Angeles County, California, US, from January 2014
 John M. Scott (1824–1898), Chief Justice of the Supreme Court of Illinois, US
 John Scott (Iowa politician) (1824–1903), Lieutenant Governor of Iowa
 John Scott (mayor), first mayor of Cumberland, Maryland, US
 John Scott (Missouri politician) (1785–1861), US Representative from Missouri and delegate
 John Guier Scott (1819–1892), US Representative from Missouri
 John E. Scott (born 1939),  Missouri state senator and president pro tem
 John P. Scott (1933–2010), New Jersey Senate member
 John Morin Scott (1730–1784), New York Continental congressman, general
 John Scott (Ohio politician), Ohio House of Representatives
 John Roger Kirkpatrick Scott (1873–1945), US Representative from Pennsylvania
 John Scott (representative) (1784–1850), US Representative from Pennsylvania
 John Scott (Pennsylvania politician, born 1824) (1824–1896), US Senator from Pennsylvania
 John Morin Scott (mayor) (1789–1858), mayor of Philadelphia, Pennsylvania
 John B. Scott (New York politician) (1789–1854), American lawyer and politician from New York
 John L. Scott Jr. (born 1953), American politician in the South Carolina Senate
 John Scott (died 1842), served briefly on the Supreme Court of the Republic of Texas (US)
John B. Scott (Texas politician), Texas Secretary of State
John T. Scott (Indiana judge) (born 1831), Justice of the Indiana Supreme Court

Kingdom of England
 John Scott (MP for Hastings), 1385–1393, MP for Hastings
 John Scott (died 1485) (c. 1423–1485), English Yorkist during the Wars of the Roses, Warden of the Cinque Ports
 John Scott (died 1533) (1480s–1533), MP for New Romney, England
 John Scott (MP for Ripon) (fl. 1572), MP for Ripon, England
 John Scott (soldier) (1570–1616), English Member of Parliament and councillor of the London Company of Virginia
 Captain John Scott (c. 1634?–1704), cartographer and Long Island settler
 John Scott (MP for York), (died 1664), MP for York
 John Scott (died 1619), MP for Chippenham

Kingdom of Scotland
 John Scot, Lord Scotstarvit (1585–1670), Scottish lawyer, politician, and writer

Kingdom of Great Britain
 John Scott (British Army officer) (1725–1775), Scottish politician, MP Caithness, Tain Burghs, and Fife
 John Scott, 1st Earl of Clonmell (1739–1798), Irish barrister and judge
 John Scott (junior), MP for Boroughbridge 1799–1806
 John Scott-Waring (1747–1819), English political agent and Member of Parliament
 John Scott, 1st Earl of Eldon (1751–1838), Lord High Chancellor of Britain

United Kingdom
 John Scott, 2nd Earl of Eldon (1805–1854), British peer and Tory politician 
 Lord John Scott (1809–1860), landowner and member of parliament for Roxburghshire
 John Scott (governor) (1814–1898), a British colonial official and governor
 John Scott (English judge) (1841–1904), English judge
 John Scott (colonial administrator) (1878–1946), British colonial administrator
 John Scott, 9th Duke of Buccleuch (1923–2007), Scottish peer, politician and landowner
 John Scott (MSP) (born 1951), former member of Scottish Parliament

Australia and Canada
 John Scott (Australian politician) (born 1934), member of the Australian House of Representatives
 John Scott (Queensland politician) (1821–1898), member of the Queensland Legislative Assembly & Legislative Council, Australia
 John Scott (Canadian politician) (1822–1857), first mayor of Bytown, later Ottawa, Canada

Science and architecture
 John Scott (entomologist) (1823–1888), English entomologist
 John Scott (botanist) (1836–1880), Scottish botanist
 John Scott (shipbuilder) (1830–1903), Scottish engineer and shipbuilder
 John Scott (agricultural engineer) (c. 1846–1909), Scottish pioneer of motorized farming
 John Oldrid Scott (1841–1913), English architect
 John Scott (architect) (1924–1992), New Zealand architect
 John Scott (medical researcher) (1931–2015), New Zealand scientist and medic
 Jack Scott (meteorologist) (1923–2008), British television weatherman
 John Scott (physician) (1797–1859), Scottish surgeon and physician in Scotland to Queen Victoria

Sports

Association football
 John Scott (1890s footballer), Scottish footballer who played for Sunderland as a forward
 John Scott (1920s footballer), Scottish footballer
 John Scott (footballer, born 1872) (1872–?), Scottish footballer
 John Scott (footballer, born 1890) (1890–?), English footballer
 John Scott (footballer, born 1942), English footballer

Baseball
 John Scott (1970s outfielder) (born 1952), American professional baseball outfielder
 John Scott (1940s outfielder) (1913–1967), American Negro leagues baseball player
 John William Scott (1887–1962), American professional baseball shortstop, also known as Jim Scott

Other sports
 John Scott Jr. (born 1975), American football coach and former player
 John Scott (rugby union) (born 1954), English international rugby union player
 John A. R. Scott, first basketball head coach of Syracuse University
 John Scott (cricket and rugby league) (1888–1964), Australian cricketer and Test umpire
 John Scott (English cricketer) (1888–1946), English cricketer
 John Scott (darts player) (born 1981), English darts player
 John Scott (horseman) (1794–1871), British thoroughbred racehorse trainer
 John Scott (ice hockey, born 1928), Canadian professional ice hockey winger
 John Scott (ice hockey, born 1982), Canadian professional ice hockey winger/defenseman
 John Scott (sailor) (born 1934), Australian competitive sailor

Other
 John Scott (adventurer) (c. 1634–1696), Captain John Scott, Long Island founder, explorer, royal advisor
 John Scott (banker) (1757–1832), English evangelical pacifist
 John Scott (Royal Navy officer) (died 1805), warrant officer in the Royal Navy, friend and secretary to Lord Nelson
 John Paul Scott (1927–1987), American Alcatraz escapee who reached San Francisco by swimming
 John Walter Scott (1845–1919), English-American stamp dealer
 John Scott, founder of Montgomery, Alabama
 John L. Scott, real estate company in Seattle
 John Maurice Scott (1948–2001), Director General of the Fiji Red Cross, murdered in 2001
 John Corse Scott (died 1840), surgeon, naturalist, and Scottish landowner
 John Wallace Scott (1832–1903), American soldier who fought in the American Civil War
 John Scott (archdeacon of Dromore) (born 1946), Irish Anglican priest
 John Scott (dean of Lismore) (died 1828), Irish Anglican priest
 John Scott (1777–1834), English priest, biographer on his father Thomas Scott

See also 

 Jon Scott (born 1958), American television host and presenter on Fox News Channel
 Jonathan Scott (disambiguation)
 Johnny Scott (disambiguation)
 Jack Scott (disambiguation)
 Scott (name)